This is a list of premiers, administrators and governors of Western State, Nigeria, including the former  Western Region. In 1976-02-03, Western State was divided into Ogun, Ondo, and Oyo states.

See also
Nigeria
States of Nigeria
List of state governors of Nigeria

References

Western
Governors